Hong Kong competed at the 1992 Summer Paralympics in Barcelona, Spain. 21 competitors from Hong Kong won 11 medals, 3 gold, 4 silver and 4 bronze and finished 28th in the medal table.

See also 
 Hong Kong at the Paralympics
 Hong Kong at the 1992 Summer Olympics

References 

Hong Kong at the Paralympics
1992 in Hong Kong sport
Nations at the 1992 Summer Paralympics